This list is of the Historic Sites of Japan located within the Prefecture of Nagano.

National Historic Sites
As of 1 August 2020, thirty-eight Sites have been designated as being of national significance (including one *Special Historic Site); the Nakasendō spans the prefectural borders with Gifu.

|}

Prefectural Historic Sites
As of 3 April 2020, sixty-eight Sites have been designated as being of prefectural importance.

Municipal Historic Sites
As of 1 May 2019, a further six hundred and eighty-one Sites have been designated as being of municipal importance.

See also

 Cultural Properties of Japan
 Shinano Province
 Nagano Prefectural Museum of History
 List of Places of Scenic Beauty of Japan (Nagano)
 List of Cultural Properties of Japan - paintings (Nagano)
 List of Cultural Properties of Japan - historical materials (Nagano)

References

External links
  Cultural Properties in Nagano Prefecture

Nagano Prefecture
 Nagano